Victor Chao is an American actor. He is best known for portraying Dr. Seiji Shimada in Mega Shark Versus Giant Octopus, Dr. Shinji Shimada in Command & Conquer: Red Alert 3 - Uprising, Eric Tsu in The Crew, Kenshi, Sektor, Goro and Triborg in Mortal Kombat X and CTU Agent McCallan and FBI Agent Mark Dornan in two seasons of 24.  Currently, he plays District Attorney Daniel Chen on General Hospital.

Filmography

Film

Television

Video games

References

External links
 
 

Living people
American male film actors
American male television actors
Place of birth missing (living people)
Year of birth missing (living people)
American male video game actors
American male voice actors
21st-century American male actors